German South Africans refers to South Africans who have full or partial German heritage.

A significant number of South Africans are descended from Germans. Most of these originally settled in the Cape Colony, but were absorbed into the Afrikaner and Afrikaans population, because they had religious and ethnic similarities to the Dutch and French. Later German migrants, especially during the Witwatersrand Gold Rush and the Natal German settlers of the 19th century, were integrated into English-speaking communities of Gauteng and Kwa-Zulu Natal.

History
Hundreds of Germans emigrated to the Cape Colony during the Dutch rule between (1652-1806) and in the succeeding centuries. In 1652 the Dutch East India Company's established a supplies station at the Cape of Good Hope under the command of Jan van Riebeeck. The party was made up of 90 settlers, most of them were Dutch & a number of people were from Germany. In the 1680s, more German farmers and women arrived at Cape Colony. In 1691, the population was 1000 Europeans especially Dutch (85%), German (5%) & Huguenots (10%) and 400 slaves. From this point onwards the white population increased to about 1300 by the year 1700. About 4000 Germans immigrated to the Cape during the Dutch period, almost all of them males. They came from all German-speaking areas of Europe. The Germans who arrived at the Cape in the seventeenth century were not emigrants but worked for the Dutch East India Company, perhaps initially in Holland, and then were sent to the Cape. Similarly in 19th century a lot of Germans came to the region on missionary purposes and settled in the region, followed by British assisted emigration of Germans to the Eastern cape region further boosted their population.

Natal German settlers: 1848
A group of German settlers came to Natal in March 1848 on the ship Beta, under a private scheme arranged by a German Jewish businessman Jonas Bergtheil. He arrived in Natal in 1843 and established the Natal Cotton Company three years later. Bergtheil saw the potential of European settlement along the coast and approached the British colonial office for immigrants. When first the British and then the Bavarian governments rejected his plans, he turned to the Kingdom of Hanover for support. Thirty-five peasant families (about 188 people) from the Osnabrück-Bremen district accepted his offer and arrived in Natal on 23 March 1848. They were settled near Port Natal and called their new home Neu-Deutschland (New Germany).
Bergtheil's cotton scheme failed after the first two crops were ravaged by bollworm. Furthermore, the ginning machinery he had ordered from England never arrived. The settlers soon abandoned cotton in favour of market gardening, and when their five-year contracts with Bergtheil ended many did not renew them. The initial years were a struggle for the settlers but gradually, with hard work, conditions improved. After about 10 years most had prospered and had been able to take ownership of their lands.

Germans in South Africa
Rudi Ball (1911-1975), German-South African Hall of Fame ice hockey player
Helen Zille (1951-present), Politician
Harry Schwarz (1924-2010), Activist
Debbie Schäfer (1966-present), Politician
James Barry Munnik Hertzog (1866-1942), Politician
Karl Wilhelm Posselt (1815-1885), German missionary
Karl Wilhelm Ludwig Pappe (1803-1862), Physician and botanist
Karl Ludwig Philipp Zeyher (1799-1858), botanist and insect collector
Johann Franz Drège (1794-1881), botanist
Baron von Ludwig (1784-1847), pharmacist and businessman
Christian Ferdinand Friedrich Krauss (1812-1890), scientist and traveler

References

German South African
South Africa
Society of South Africa
 
History of the Dutch East India Company